NGC 4710 is an edge-on spiral galaxy in the constellation Coma Berenices.  Its prominent x-shaped structure reveals the existence of an underlying bar. NGC 4710 possesses both thin and thick discs.

References

External links

Unbarred spiral galaxies
Coma Berenices
4710
07980
43375